The 1971 Indian general election polls in United Andhra Pradesh were held for 42 seats in the state. The result was a victory for the Indian National Congress which won 28 out of 42 seats. This election also saw introduction of Telangana Praja Samithi which won 10 out of the 14 seats it contested, mostly in the Telangana region.

Voting and results

Results by alliance

Members elected

See also 
Elections in Andhra Pradesh

References

External links
 Website of Election Commission of India
 CNN-IBN Lok Sabha Election History

 Indian general elections in Andhra Pradesh
1970s in Andhra Pradesh
Andhra Pradesh